Mary Johnson may refer to:

 Mary Johnson (first lady) (c. 1830–1887), first lady of California.
 Mary Johnson (actress) (1896–1975), Swedish silent film performer
 Mary Johnson (singer) (1898–1983), African American lowdown blues singer
 Mary Johnson Lowe (1924–1999), née Mary Johnson, American jurist
 Mary Johnson (cricketer) (born 1924), English cricketer
 Mary Lea Johnson (1926–1990), American theatrical producer, entrepreneur and philanthropist
 Mary Johnson (activist) (born 1948), American advocate for disability rights; founded Ragged Edge magazine
 Mary Johnson (writer) (born 1958), American writer and Director of A Room of Her Own Foundation
 Mary Johnson (politician), member of the North Dakota House of Representatives
 Mary C. Johnson, one of the first three women to practice law in Georgia

See also
 Nathan and Mary (Polly) Johnson properties, American National Historic Landmark in New Bedford, Massachusetts
 
 Mary Johnston (disambiguation)
 Marie Johnson (disambiguation)
 Mary Johnson Harris (born 1963), Louisiana educator
 Johnson (surname)